Brasilicereus markgrafii is a species of cactus which is endemic to Brazil. It occurs in the campos rupestres (rocky fields) montane savanna.

References

Cactoideae
Cacti of South America
Endemic flora of Brazil
Vulnerable flora of South America
Taxonomy articles created by Polbot